San Pancrazio Salentino is a comune in the province of Brindisi in Apulia, on the south-east Italy coast. Its main economic activities are tourism and the growing of olives and grapes.

Twin towns — sister cities
San Pancrazio Salentino is twinned with:

  Bisceglie, Italy

References

Cities and towns in Apulia
Localities of Salento